Louis Samuel Reed (born 25 July 1997) is an English footballer who plays as a midfielder for League Two club Mansfield Town.

Club career

Sheffield United
Having come through the ranks of Sheffield United's academy, Reed made his first-team debut in a 1–0 home victory against South Yorkshire rivals Rotherham United on 8 April 2014. At 16 years and 257 days old, he is the youngest player ever to represent Sheffield United in league football.

After an impressive performance in a win over Fenerbahçe in a pre-season friendly, Reed signed a three-year professional contract with Sheffield United. He went on to make his first start for the club in the opening game of the 2014–15 season. Reed signed a new three-year deal with United on 24 July 2015. In July 2017, he joined Chesterfield on a season-long loan deal. He was later transfer-listed by Sheffield United at the end of the 2017–18 season.

Peterborough United
In June 2018, Reed joined Peterborough United for an undisclosed fee. In May 2021, after three seasons with the club, it was announced that Reed would leave Peterborough at the end of his contract.

Swindon Town
After a brief period on trial with Doncaster Rovers, Reed joined League Two club Swindon Town on 6 August 2021 on a free transfer. Following an impressive debut season, Reed was voted the club's Players' Player of the Year at the club's annual end of season awards.

Mansfield Town
On 15 January 2023, Reed signed an 18-month contract with EFL League Two side Mansfield Town, after joining the club for an undisclosed fee.

Career statistics

Honours
Individual
Swindon Town Players' Player of the Year: 2021–22

References

External links

England profile at The FA

1997 births
Living people
English footballers
Association football midfielders
Sheffield United F.C. players
Swindon Town F.C. players
English Football League players
England youth international footballers
Chesterfield F.C. players
Mansfield Town F.C. players
Peterborough United F.C. players
Footballers from Barnsley